John Molles  was an Irish Anglican priest in the 18th-century: a  prebendary of Newchapel in Cashel Cathedral  he was  Archdeacon of Emly from  1736 his death in 1740.

References

Archdeacons of Emly
18th-century Irish Anglican priests
1740 deaths